The State Public Works Engineering Corps  is a division of civil servants (fonctionnaires) working for the Government of France. Its members are mainly employed as team or project managers in the French Civil Service, overseeing areas such as infrastructure, environment, transportation, and energy.

Missions 
The members of the corps are in charge of the supervision and management of public policies requiring technical and scientific skills; their work is not restricted to traditional public works areas, but include areas as :
 Civil engineering
Real estate management
 Security of the national road network
 Sustainable development
 Transportation
 Management of natural and technological risks
 Urban planning
 Biodiversity
 Hydrology and Hydrometry
 Air quality
 Geology and Mining
 Energy
 Civil Aviation within the DGAC
 Rail safety
 Maritime Safety and Security within French Ships Safety Centers
 Port Facility
 Maintenance and Safety of inland waterways
 IT and big data
 Economic development
Education and Research
 ...

Engineers carry out their assignments and responsibilities throughout France, including French overseas territories. They could also be stationed in French embassies abroad, as well as in international and European Union organizations, such as the World Bank and European Commission.

Formation 
The majority of the engineers are recruited directly during their 2-years post secondary studies in classes préparatoires by taking a competitive examination in mathematics, physics, and engineering. If accepted they join the National School of Public Works as a paid civil servant in training for 3 years.

During their studies in this engineering school (grandes écoles d'ingénieurs), they receive a multidisciplinary education in the fields of competences in which they will be brought to work once graduated. They also carry out a professional internship per year of study, in France or abroad. After graduation, they can go directly to an assigned position in the civil service. It is also possible for them to be selected to do a thesis in a field of interest of the Government or to carry out an additional year of specialization study to occupy certain positions requiring specific technical skills.

See also
French Civil Service
Ministry for the Ecological Transition (France)
Corps of Bridges, Waters and Forests

References

French Civil Service
French civil servants
French engineers